Johann Gottfried Brügelmann (baptized 6 July 1750 in Elberfeld, now a district of Wuppertal - 27 December 1802, Ratingen) was a German industrialist, most notable as founder of the first factory on mainland Europe, one of the forerunners of the Industrial Revolution.

External links

guelcher-chronik.de

1750 births
1802 deaths
People of the Industrial Revolution
18th-century German businesspeople
Businesspeople from Wuppertal